Notes on Nursing: What it is and What it is Not is a book first published by Florence Nightingale in 1859. A 76-page volume with 3 page appendix published by Harrison of Pall Mall, it was intended to give hints on nursing to those entrusted with the health of others. Florence Nightingale stressed that it was not meant to be a comprehensive guide from which to teach one's self to be a nurse but to help in the practice of treating others.

In her introduction to the 1974 edition, Joan Quixley, then head of the Nightingale School of Nursing, wrote that despite the passage of time since Notes on Nursing was published, "the book astonishes one with its relevance to modern attitudes and skills in nursing, whether this be practised at home by the 'ordinary woman', in hospital or in the community. The social, economic and professional differences of the nineteenth and twentieth centuries in no way hinder the young student or pupil from developing, if he or she is motivated to do so, its unchanged fundamentals by way of intelligent thought and practice". "With its mid-nineteenth century background of poverty, neglect, ignorance and prejudice the book was a challenge to contemporary views of nursing, of nurses and of the patient". "The book was the first of its kind ever to be written. It appeared at a time when the simple rules of health were only beginning to be known, when its topics were of vital importance not only for the well-being and recovery of patients, when hospitals were riddled with infection, when nurses were still mainly regarded as ignorant, uneducated persons. The book has, inevitably, its place in the history of nursing, for it was written by the founder of modern nursing".

The book included advice and practices for the following areas:
ventilation and warming
health in houses
petty management (how things are done by others when you must be away)
noise
variety (environment)
taking food and what kinds of food
bed and bedding
light
cleanliness of rooms
personal cleanliness
chattering hopes and advices (the false assurances and recommendations of family and friends to the sick)
observation of the sick

Later editions of Notes on Nursing are available to the public today.

References

The 2009 edition of Notes on Nursing: A Guide for today's care givers is published by Elsevier in conjunction with the International Council of Nurses.

External links

Contents of the 1860 First American Edition book online
 
Notes on Nursing: Dr Constance B Schuyler (1992), contains facsimile of First Edition published in London 1859
Notes for Nurses
 Florence Nightgale - Notes on Nursing Audio and text site of this book that shaped the early development of modern nursing.

1859 non-fiction books
Medical manuals
Works about nursing